KAYT (88.1 FM) is a radio station broadcasting an Urban contemporary / Christian radio format. Licensed to Jena, Louisiana, United States, the station serves the Alexandria, Louisiana area. The station is currently owned by Black Media Works, Inc. The transmitter is located southwest of Dry Prong, Louisiana on the KLAX-TV tower.

Translators

References

External links
 
 
 
 

Christian radio stations in Louisiana
Mass media in Alexandria, Louisiana